Arthritica crassiformis is a species of small marine bivalve mollusc in the family Lasaeidae.

References
 Powell A. W. B., New Zealand Mollusca, William Collins Publishers Ltd, Auckland, New Zealand 1979 

Lasaeidae
Bivalves of New Zealand
Molluscs described in 1935